Arvell "Bill" Riggins (February 7, 1900 – March 8, 1943) was an American baseball shortstop in the Negro leagues. He played from 1920 to 1936 with several teams, including the Detroit Stars from 1920 to 1926.

Riggins joined the Detroit Stars at the forming of the Negro National League in 1920, and he stayed with the team until 1926.

Riggins died aged 43 in New York City. He is buried at the Beverly Hills Cemetery in Peekskill, New York.

References

External links
 and Baseball-Reference Black Baseball stats and Seamheads
  and Seamheads

1900 births
1943 deaths
Chicago American Giants players
Detroit Stars players
Homestead Grays players
Lincoln Giants players
New York Black Yankees players
Cleveland Hornets players
Burials in New York (state)
20th-century African-American sportspeople
Baseball infielders